10th Congress may refer to:

10th Congress of the Philippines (1995–1998)
10th Congress of the Russian Communist Party (Bolsheviks) (1921)
10th National Congress of the Chinese Communist Party (1973)
10th National Congress of the Communist Party of Vietnam (2006)
10th National Congress of the Kuomintang (1969)
10th National Congress of the Lao People's Revolutionary Party (2016)
10th National People's Congress (2003–2008)
10th United States Congress (1807–1809)